Kelly Greene is a Canadian politician who was elected to the Legislative Assembly of British Columbia in the 2020 British Columbia general election. She represents the electoral district of Richmond-Steveston as a member of the British Columbia New Democratic Party (BC NDP). From 2018 to 2020 she served as a city councillor in Richmond.

Biography
Born in Richmond, Greene grew up in the community of Steveston and went to Hugh Boyd Secondary School. She attended the University of British Columbia, graduating with a bachelor of arts in 2002, then worked for accounting and banking firms.

In 2016 she became involved in a local parent group against school closures in Richmond, leading her to consider entering politics. In the 2017 provincial election she ran for the NDP in Richmond-Steveston, placing second against incumbent Liberal candidate John Yap. She was then elected to the Richmond City Council in the 2018 municipal election. 

Greene contested the riding of Richmond-Steveston as an NDP candidate again in the 2020 provincial election, this time winning the seat by taking 52% of the vote, ahead of Liberal candidate Matt Pitcairn. On November 16, 2020, she resigned her city council role to become member of the Legislative Assembly (MLA). She was named Parliamentary Secretary for the Environment by Premier John Horgan on November 26, 2020, supporting Minister of Environment and Climate Change Strategy George Heyman.

On December 7, 2022 she was appointed Parliamentary Secretary for Fisheries and Aquaculture by Premier David Eby, supporting Minister of Water, Land and Resource Stewardship Nathan Cullen.

Electoral history

Provincial elections

Municipal elections 
Top 8 candidates elected — Incumbents marked with "(X)". Elected members' names are in bold

References

External link

21st-century Canadian politicians
21st-century Canadian women politicians
British Columbia New Democratic Party MLAs
Women MLAs in British Columbia
Living people
Richmond, British Columbia city councillors
University of British Columbia alumni
Year of birth missing (living people)